Fuenllana is a municipality in Ciudad Real, Castile-La Mancha, Spain. It has a population of 320.

Fuenllana was called Laminium during Roman times, incorporated into Roman territory after the subjugation of the Carpetani.

References 

Dictionary of Greek and Roman Geography

Municipalities in the Province of Ciudad Real